Jatin Khurana (Birth Date: 6 October 1984) is a film actor and producer.

Educational Life
Jatin Khurana did his schooling from Delhi's Bharti Public School (Swasthya Vihar) and college from Delhi University. He also did his acting course from legendary acting guru Kishore Namit Kapoor in Mumbai.

Film career
Jatin Khurana hails from Delhi and has been a part of several theatre groups there.  Later, he moved to Mumbai and secured the lead role in a film called Ye Stupid Pyaar.  The movie Ye Stupid Pyaar released in the year 2011. He also worked as an assistant director in movies like Love Ke Chakkar Mein and Zindagi Khoobsoorat Hai. Jatin played the character of Chandrashekhar Azad in the movie Jai Jawaan Jai Kisaan.

Actor

Award
 Special Award at International Film Festival of Prayag 2015 For Playing The role of Chandrashekhar Azad .

References

External links
 
 

1984 births
Living people
Indian male film actors
Film producers from Delhi
Male actors in Hindi cinema
Male actors from Delhi